The bean goose (Anser fabalis or Anser serrirostris) is a goose that breeds in northern Europe and Eurosiberia. It has two distinct varieties, one inhabiting taiga habitats and one inhabiting tundra. These are recognised as separate species by the American Ornithologists' Union and the IOC (taiga bean goose and tundra bean goose), but are considered a single species by other authorities, such as the British Ornithologists' Union. It is migratory and winters further south in Europe and Asia.

Description 
In the nominate subspecies, males average  and females average . The bill is black at the base and tip, with an orange band across the middle; the legs and feet are also bright orange.

The upper wing-coverts are dark brown, as in the white-fronted goose (Anser albifrons) and the lesser white-fronted goose (A. erythropus), but differing from these in having narrow white fringes to the feathers.

The voice is a loud honking, higher pitched in the smaller subspecies.

The closely related pink-footed goose (A. brachyrhynchus) has the bill short, bright pink in the middle, and the feet also pink, the upper wing-coverts being nearly of the same bluish-grey as in the greylag goose. In size and bill structure, it is very similar to Anser fabalis rossicus, and in the past was often treated as a sixth subspecies of bean goose.

Taxonomy 
The English and scientific names of the bean goose come from its habit in the past of grazing in bean field stubbles in winter. Anser is the Latin for "goose", and fabalis is derived from the Latin 
faba, a broad bean.

There are five subspecies, with complex variation in body size and bill size and pattern; generally, size increases from north to south and from west to east. Some ornithologists (including AOU 2007) split them into two species based on breeding habitat, whether in forest bogs in the subarctic taiga, or on the arctic tundra. The taiga and tundra bean goose diverged about 2.5 million years ago and established secondary contact ca. 60,000 years ago, resulting in extensive gene flow. The complex has included several contested species including Sushkin's goose (Anser neglectus).
Taiga bean goose (Anser fabalis sensu stricto) (Latham, 1787)
 A. f. fabalis (Latham, 1787). Scandinavia east to the Urals. Large; bill long and narrow, with broad orange band. Anser fabalis fabalis is one of the species to which the Agreement on the Conservation of African-Eurasian Migratory Waterbirds (AEWA) applies.
 A. f. johanseni (Delacour, 1951). West Siberian taiga. Large; bill long and narrow, with narrow orange band.
 A. f. middendorffii (Severtzov, 1873). East Siberian taiga. Very large; bill long and stout, with narrow orange band.
Tundra bean goose (Anser serrirostris, if treated as a distinct species) (Gould, 1852)
 A. s. rossicus (Buturlin, 1933). Northern Russian tundra east to the Taimyr Peninsula. Small; bill short and stubby, with narrow orange band. Anser fabalis rossicus is one of the species to which the Agreement on the Conservation of African-Eurasian Migratory Waterbirds (AEWA) applies.
 A. s. serrirostris (Gould, 1852). East Siberian tundra. Large; bill long and stout, with narrow orange band.

Distribution 

The bean goose is a rare winter visitor to Britain. There are two regular wintering flocks of taiga bean goose, in the Yare Valley, Norfolk and the Avon Valley, Scotland. A formerly regular flock in Dumfries and Galloway no longer occurs there. The tundra bean goose has no regular wintering sites, but is found in small groups among other grey goose species – among the most regular localities are WWT Slimbridge, Gloucestershire and Holkham Marshes, Norfolk.

The Taiga bean geese Anser fabalis fabalis wintering in Europe are considered to migrate across three different flyways: Western, Central and Eastern; which has been confirmed by stable isotope analysis of their flight feathers.

References

Further reading

External links

 RSPB Birds by Name – Bean Goose
 BirdGuides Bean Goose Page
 Cyberbirding: Bean Goose pictures
 
 
 
 
 

Bean Goose
Geese
Birds of Asia
Birds of Pakistan
Birds of Europe
Birds of the Middle East
Birds of Japan
Natural monuments of Japan
Taxobox binomials not recognized by IUCN